Carlos Pedevilla (born c. 1980) is an Argentine actor. Pedevilla is perhaps better remembered for his characterization of Coco in the Telefe production, Chiquititas.

Pedevilla made his television acting debut in El Arbol Azul (The Blue Tree), where he had the opportunity to work alongside Andrea Del Boca.

During the 1990s, he acted in Chiquititas, as Georgina Mollo's Georgi's romantic interest. While Coco and Georgi dated, Coco generally despised the rest of the children living in the Chiquititas orphan home.

After leaving Chiquititas, Pedevilla retired from acting on the screen.

See also
List of Argentines

External links

1980s births
Living people
Argentine male actors
Place of birth missing (living people)